Virginie Guilhaume (born 30 November 1977) is a French television presenter.

Television career 
Virginie Guilhaume graduated from the École supérieure de journalisme de Paris. She began her career as a production assistant for television presenters, including Thierry Ardisson, Guillaume Durand and Michel Drucker. First a journalist, image reporter, then chief editor, France 2 gave her the opportunity in February 2007 to present entertainment programs.

She joined the channel to host with Olivier Minne special evening shows like La Saint Valentin en chansons. She then presented during summer 2007 the program Les Rois du Rire, broadcast on Saturday during the second part of the evening. The program was then broadcast on some Saturdays in the late afternoon, in the evening of New Year's Eve, or more exceptionally, as a tribute to deceased humorists. She continued in the meantime to present special programs in prime, often with Olivier Minne, including Tubes des Tubes in July 2007, Les stars de l'année 2007 in December 2007, and even Les Femmes en chansons in April 2008.

In 2008, Virginie Guilhaume joined M6 where she presented in August a program dedicated to the jet set titled Stars et Fortunes. In September, she presented the weekly documentary dedicated to celebrities Accès Privé. In 2009 and 2010, she presented the seventh and eighth season of Nouvelle Star, succeeding to Virginie Efira.

She was then replaced by Faustine Bollaert for Accès Privé from November 2010 to January 2011 due to maternity leave. She started presenting again the program from January to June 2011. It was also Faustine Bollaert who replaced her to present the Grand bêtisier des stars in December 2010.

In June 2011, Virginie Guilhaume left M6 to return on France 2 in September of that year, the channel of her beginnings. She presented a new program titled Secrets de famille, broadcast on Wednesday during the second part of the evening. She was also entrusted on a primetime presenting the different programs of the channel including their presenters. The program titled C'est la rentrée was broadcast in September 2012. She then presented different programs such as Rire ensemble contre la racisme and Les Rois du Bêtisier. In October 2012, she co-hosted again with Olivier Minne the Concert pour la tolérance. She then presented in February 2013 at the Zénith de Paris the Victoires de la Musique with Laurent Ruquier, broadcast on France 2.

In July 2013, she presented on France 2 the first season of the professional pastry contest Qui sera le prochain grand pâtissier ? for four episodes. Since September 2013, she replaced Alessandra Sublet on the presentation of the program Hier Encore with Charles Aznavour. She also presented at that time Un air de famille on the same channel, a program that ended on 4 November 2013. She later presented the Bêtisier de Noël at the end of the year and the backstage of Le Grand Show.

She presented in January 2014 the program Retour en terre inconnue along with Frédéric Lopez, broadcast live just after Rendez-vous en terre inconnue. The following month, she co-hosted with Laurent Ruquier the Victoires de la Musique on France 2. The program managed to reach the symbolic audience of 3 million viewers, which had not happened for five years. In May and June 2014, she presented the second season of the pastry contest Qui sera le prochain grand pâtissier ? for six episodes.

In May 2015, she is the spokesperson for France in the Eurovision Song Contest 2015, which took place in Vienna, announcing directly from Paris the score given by the French jury. In June, at the eve of the Fête de la musique, she co-hosted on France 2 the evening program Du soleil et des tubes with Patrick Sébastien from Nice.

In July 2015, she presented the third season of the pastry contest Qui sera le prochain grand pâtissier ? for four episodes. In September 2015, she started presenting on France 2 the weekly cultural program Grand Public. In February 2016, she co-hosted with Bruno Guillon the Victoires de la Musique. In November 2016, Virginie Guilhaume left France 2.

Personal life 
Virginie Guilhaume was born in Paris, the daughter of Philippe Guilhaume, former executive director of Antenne 2 and FR3 from August 1989 to December 1990, and Brigitte Schmit, former director of communications at Antenne 2. She is the grandniece of Jacques Chaban-Delmas.

Virginie Guilhaume married in 2007 the television producer Stéphane Gateau. They have one son named Romeo, born on 3 December 2010. The couple divorced a few years later.

In November 2017, she was expecting her second child. On 29 March 2018, she gave birth to a girl named Marnie. The father is Hervé Louis, the co-founder of Sushi Shop, who sold his company in September 2018 for 240 million euros.

Humanitarian engagement 
Virginie Guilhaume is engaged since 2007 to a humanitarian foundation Caméléon, that protects and rehabilitates young girls from Philippines victim of sexual abuse.

In 2010, she is one of the spokespersons of the Flamme Marie Claire, a caritative event for the schooling of disadvantaged little girls in the world that allows to raise funds by selling candles.

Television programs

Filmography

References

External links 
 

1977 births
French television presenters
French women television presenters
Mass media people from Paris
Living people